The 1988 Jade Solid Gold Best Ten Music Awards Presentation was held in January 1989. It is part of the Jade Solid Gold Best Ten Music Awards Presentation series held in Hong Kong.

Top 10 song awards 
The top 10 songs (十大勁歌金曲) of 1988 are as follows.

Additional awards

References 
 Top ten songs award 1988, Tvcity.tvb.com
 Additional awards 1988, Tvcity.tvb.com

Jade Solid Gold Best Ten Music Awards Presentation, 1988
Jade Solid Gold Best Ten Music Awards